University of Wisconsin may refer to:

 The University of Wisconsin System, the public state university system of Wisconsin, and its components:
 Research Universities granting doctorates:
University of Wisconsin–Madison, the largest and oldest university in this system, which is abbreviated UW and known as the flagship campus of the system
University of Wisconsin–Milwaukee, the only other research university in the system, abbreviated UWM or occasionally UW–M
 Four-year comprehensive universities primarily granting baccalaureates:
University of Wisconsin–Eau Claire
University of Wisconsin–Green Bay
University of Wisconsin–La Crosse
University of Wisconsin–Oshkosh
University of Wisconsin–Parkside
University of Wisconsin–Platteville
University of Wisconsin–River Falls
University of Wisconsin–Stevens Point
University of Wisconsin–Stout
University of Wisconsin–Superior
University of Wisconsin–Whitewater
 University of Wisconsin Colleges, formerly the UW Centers, primarily granting two-year degrees, account for one unit of the system.
University of Wisconsin–Baraboo/Sauk County
University of Wisconsin–Barron County
University of Wisconsin–Fond du Lac
University of Wisconsin–Fox Valley
University of Wisconsin–Manitowoc
University of Wisconsin–Marathon County
University of Wisconsin–Marinette
University of Wisconsin–Marshfield/Wood County
University of Wisconsin–Richland
University of Wisconsin–Rock County
University of Wisconsin–Sheboygan
University of Wisconsin–Washington County
University of Wisconsin–Waukesha
University of Wisconsin Colleges Online
University of Wisconsin Extension
 The University of Wisconsin (1956–1971), a former institution formed by the merger of four campuses (Madison, Milwaukee, Green Bay, Parkside)
 The Wisconsin State Universities, which merged with the above to form the University of Wisconsin System

See also

Related to the University of Wisconsin 
University of Wisconsin Hospital and Clinics
University of Wisconsin Credit Union
University of Wisconsin–Milwaukee Golda Meir Library
History of the University of Wisconsin–Milwaukee
University of Wisconsin-Milwaukee Engelmann Field
University of Wisconsin-Milwaukee J. Martin Klotsche Center
University of Wisconsin–Milwaukee Panthers

Not related to the University of Wisconsin 
Wisconsin Technical College System
:Category:Universities and colleges in Wisconsin
Concordia University Wisconsin
Wisconsin International University College, a school in Ghana
Medical College of Wisconsin